Dimeo van der Horst (born 23 June 1991) is a Dutch 3x3 basketball player who plays for the Netherlands men's national 3x3 team. Standing at 1.95 m (6 ft 5 in), Van der Horst primarily plays as point guard.

Born in Amsterdam, he played 11 seasons of professional basketball in the Dutch Basketball League for four different clubs.

Professional career

Amsterdam 
Van der Horst started his professional career in 2007 with Amsterdam Basketball, making his debut in a friendly game during the Haarlem Basketball Week, at age 16. He was given a place on the roster of the senior team in 2008–09 by coach Arik Shivek.

On 9 October 2008, Van der Horst made his debut in the Eredivisie, scoring 3 points against the West-Brabant Giants. He won the 2008 and 2009 national championship with Amsterdam. In 2011, the club was declared bankrupt, forcing Van der Horst to find a new club.

Matrixx Magixx 
Van der Horst signed with the West-Brabant Giants in July 2011. However, the Giants were also dissolved after a bankruptcy, which led him to play for the Matrixx Magixx instead.

Donar 
Van der Horst played as the back-up point guard for Donar (then named GasTerra Flames) in the 2012–13 season.

Return to the Magixx 
Van der Horst returned to the Magixx for a second stint in 2013, after agreeing with Donar to leave his contract one year early.

Apollo Amsterdam 
In 2013, Van der Horst returned to Amsterdam to play for the new club Apollo Amsterdam. He was the starting point guard for Apollo in five seasons. In the 2016–17 season, he averaged a career-high 15.5 points per game. On 21 December 2018, Van der Horst scored a career-high 35 points in a 91–89 home win over Rotterdam. In his final season, he averaged 15.5 points, 4.8 rebounds and 4.6 assists per game for Apollo.

Netherlands national team
Van der Horst played for the Netherlands national basketball team at the EuroBasket 2017 qualification.

3x3 basketball
Van der Horst played with the Netherlands men's national 3x3 team at the 2018 FIBA 3x3 World Cup, where he won a silver medal. He also played at the 2019 FIBA 3x3 World Cup, where they finished seventh. One year later, Van der Horst  played at the 2020 Summer Olympics in Tokyo, where they finished in the fifth place.

References

External links
 Dutch Basketball League profile
 
 
 

1991 births
Living people
Point guards
Dutch men's basketball players
Dutch Basketball League players
Amsterdam Basketball players
Apollo Amsterdam players
Matrixx Magixx players
Donar (basketball club) players
Basketball players from Amsterdam
3x3 basketball players at the 2020 Summer Olympics
Olympic 3x3 basketball players of the Netherlands